Birkhall (from the Scots Birk Hauch: "Birch River-meadow") is a  estate on Royal Deeside, Aberdeenshire, Scotland, owned by King Charles III. It is located alongside the River Muick to the south-west of Ballater.

History
The property was built in 1715. It was acquired from the Gordon family (owners of the Abergeldie Estate) who had acquired it from the Farquharsone family. Birkhall was acquired by Prince Albert, consort to Queen Victoria, as part of the Balmoral Castle estate in 1849 and given to his eldest son, Albert Edward, Prince of Wales. Victoria bought Birkhall back to provide accommodation for her staff and extended family in 1884; Prince Albert Edward had only visited Birkhall once, as he preferred the larger Abergeldie Castle. Birkhall was occupied by General Sir Dighton Probyn, Keeper of the Privy Purse to King Edward VII and Comptroller to Queen Alexandra, in the late 19th century and early 20th century.

A fine wire suspension bridge, erected in 1880 by John Harper, crosses the River Muick at Birkhall.

King George V lent Birkhall in the 1930s to the Duke and Duchess of York (later King George VI and Queen Elizabeth), who holidayed there with their children, Princess Elizabeth and Princess Margaret. The house was redecorated by the Yorks, who also replanted the gardens. After the Duke of York ascended to the throne in 1936, the new King and Queen occupied Balmoral during the summer while later on Princess Elizabeth, her husband Prince Philip and their children occupied Birkhall during the late summer season. In 1947, Elizabeth and Philip had spent a portion of their honeymoon at Birkhall.

David Bowes-Lyon, the brother of Queen Elizabeth The Queen Mother, died at Birkhall of a heart attack after suffering from hemiplegia on 13 September 1961, aged 59. The Queen Mother discovered him dead in bed.

Birkhall was inherited by Charles, Prince of Wales (later King Charles III), from the Queen Mother upon her death in 2002. He also spent his second honeymoon at Birkhall in 2005 with his wife Camilla. In 2011, Prince William and his wife Catherine, then the Duke and Duchess of Cambridge, celebrated Hogmanay at Birkhall.

In March 2020, Charles, Prince of Wales (later King Charles III) and the Duchess of Cornwall self-isolated at Birkhall after the prince tested positive for COVID-19.

It has been reported after the accession of Charles III, he will not take up residence at Balmoral Castle while he is on the estate but rather will continue stay at Birkhall during the Balmoral holidays.

See also
Highgrove House, near Tetbury, Gloucestershire, the family residence of King Charles III and the Queen Consort, owned by the Duchy of Cornwall
Clarence House, in St James's, London, current London residence of the King and Queen Consort and the King's official residence when he was Prince of Wales

References

Further reading
Titchmarsh, Alan. "Birkhall; The home of The Prince of Wales on the Balmoral estate, Aberdeenshire", Country Life, 25 March 2020. Retrieved 22 April 2021.

Country houses in Aberdeenshire
Royal residences in Scotland
Category B listed buildings in Aberdeenshire